Old Spanish Customers is a 1932 British comedy film directed by Lupino Lane and starring Leslie Fuller, Binnie Barnes and Drusilla Wills.

Plot
British couple Bill and Martha (Leslie Fuller and Drusilla Wills) win a trip to Spain and enjoy a series of adventures, with henpecked Bill mistaken for a famous toreador and ending up in a bullfight.

Cast
 Leslie Fuller as Bill Smithers
 Drusilla Wills as Martha Smithers
 Binnie Barnes as Carmen
 Wallace Lupino as Pedro
 Hal Gordon as Manuelito
 Ernest Sefton as Tormitio
 Hal Walters as Dancing partner
 Betty Fields

Critical reception
TV Guide noted "A formula plot which delivers predictable results," and gave the film two out of five stars

References

Bibliography
 Sutton, David R. A chorus of raspberries: British film comedy 1929-1939. University of Exeter Press, 2000.

External links

1932 films
1932 comedy films
Films shot at British International Pictures Studios
Films directed by Lupino Lane
British comedy films
Films set in London
Films set in Spain
British black-and-white films
1930s English-language films
1930s British films